The Strother Field Tetrahedron Wind Indicator at Strother Field in Winfield, Kansas was listed on the National Register of Historic Places in 2015.

It played a role in the World War II Battle of Kansas.

References

Transportation on the National Register of Historic Places in Kansas
Cowley County, Kansas
World War II on the National Register of Historic Places
Air transportation infrastructure on the National Register of Historic Places